Lake Katrine is a hamlet (and census-designated place (CDP)) in Ulster County, New York, United States. The population was 2,522 at the 2020 census.

Lake Katrine is a community in the western part of the Town of Ulster, located near a small lake, also called Lake Katrine. The hamlet is north of the City of Kingston.

History

The community was once called "Pine Bush" and the lake was known as  "Auntrens Pond."

Geography

The community is located next to Esopus Creek.

Demographics

As of the census of 2000, there were 2,396 people, 821 households, and 487 families residing in the CDP. The population density was 1,084.1 per square mile (418.6/km2). There were 891 housing units at an average density of 403.1/sq mi (155.7/km2). The racial makeup of the CDP was 91.44% White, 4.09% African American, 0.33% Native American, 1.96% Asian, 0.25% Pacific Islander, 0.25% from other races, and 1.67% from two or more races. Hispanic or Latino of any race were 2.21% of the population.

There were 821 households, out of which 27.5% had children under the age of 18 living with them, 44.1% were married couples living together, 11.0% had a female householder with no husband present, and 40.6% were non-families. 34.0% of all households were made up of individuals, and 12.4% had someone living alone who was 65 years of age or older. The average household size was 2.24 and the average family size was 2.88.

In the CDP, the population was spread out, with 17.9% under the age of 18, 5.6% from 18 to 24, 29.0% from 25 to 44, 23.5% from 45 to 64, and 24.1% who were 65 years of age or older. The median age was 44 years. For every 100 females, there were 81.7 males. For every 100 females age 18 and over, there were 81.2 males.

The median income for a household in the CDP was $38,017, and the median income for a family was $46,375. Males had a median income of $36,184 versus $28,214 for females. The per capita income for the CDP was $18,713. About 5.5% of families and 13.2% of the population were below the poverty line, including 5.6% of those under age 18 and 14.7% of those age 65 or over.

References

Census-designated places in New York (state)
Census-designated places in Ulster County, New York
Hamlets in New York (state)
Hamlets in Ulster County, New York